The 2021–22 Liga Portugal 2, also known as Liga Portugal SABSEG for sponsorship reasons, was the 32nd season of Portuguese football's second-tier league, and the second season under the current Liga Portugal 2 title. A total of 18 teams were competing in this division, including reserve sides from top-flight Primeira Liga teams.

Teams

A total of 18 teams contest the league, including 13 sides from the 2020–21 season, 3 teams relegated from the 2020–21 Primeira Liga and 2 promoted from the 2020–21 Campeonato de Portugal.

Farense and Nacional were relegated to 2021–22 Liga Portugal 2 after finishing in 17th and 18th placed teams in 2020–21 Primeira Liga. 

Rio Ave were relegated after finishing in 16th place in 2020–21 Primeira Liga and losing the Relegation play-offs against Arouca.

Trofense (promoted after a six-year absence) and Estrela da Amadora (promoted for the first time) were promoted from the 2020–21 Campeonato de Portugal, replacing Oliveirense and Cova da Piedade.

Cova da Piedade failed to produce valid licensing documentation to compete in the 2021–22 season of the Liga Portugal 2, so they have been relegated by the Portuguese Football Professional League to the Liga 3. As a result, Vilafranquense, that finished in 17th place in the 2020–21 Liga Portugal 2 were invited to play in the second tier for the 2021–22 season.

Team changes

Relegated from 2020–21 Primeira Liga
Farense
Nacional
Rio Ave

Promoted from 2020–21 Campeonato de Portugal
Estrela da Amadora
Trofense

Promoted to 2021–22 Primeira Liga
Estoril
Vizela
Arouca

Relegated to 2021–22 Liga 3
Oliveirense
Cova da Piedade

Stadium and locations

Personnel and sponsors

Season summary

League table

Relegation play-offs
The relegation play-offs took place on 21 and 29 May 2022.

All times are WEST (UTC+1).

|}

Sporting Covilhã won 2–0 on aggregate and will play in the 2022–23 Liga Portugal 2; Alverca will play in the 2022–23 Liga 3.

Results

Positions by round
The table lists the positions of teams after each week of matches. In order to preserve chronological evolvements, any postponed matches are not included to the round at which they were originally scheduled, but added to the full round they were played immediately afterwards.

Awards

Monthly awards

Number of teams by district

References 

Liga Portugal 2 seasons
2
Portugal